Samaniego may refer to:

 Samaniego (surname) (including a list of people with the name)
 Félix María de Samaniego, a spanish fabulist
 Samaniego, Nariño, a town and municipality in the Nariño Department, Colombia
 Samaniego, Spain, a town and municipality in Araba (Álava), Basque Country, Spain
 Villar de Samaniego, a village and municipality in Salamanca, Spain